Sia Kangri (7,422 m, 24,350 ft) is a mountain in the Baltoro Muztagh in the Karakoram. Its summit lies on the border of Pakistan and China. About a kilometer southeast of the Sia Kangri summit is the  tri point  where territories controlled by India, Pakistan and China meet. Territories on all sides are disputed. The land immediately to the southwest of the peak is claimed by both Pakistan and India and controlled by Pakistan. The land to the northeast is part of the Trans-Karakoram Tract, controlled by China under a 1963 border agreement with Pakistan but is claimed by India. The land to the southeast is claimed by Pakistan and India, but controlled by India, as a part of Ladakh. It is the 63rd highest mountain in the world, and the 25th highest in Pakistan. The peak is on the watershed between the Indus River basin and the Tarim Basin. Indira Col which is 3 km to the east is India's northernmost point.

Sia Kangri was first climbed in 1934 by the International Himalaya Expedition led by the Swiss-German mountaineer Günter Dyhrenfurth. The summit party included Hettie Dyhrenfurth, who thereby set the women's world altitude record, which stood for 20 years. Lately, Pakistan has opened Sia Kangri peak for mountaineers & climbers who can obtain permission from Islamabad to summit Sia Kangri.

See also
 Indira Col
 List of highest mountains
 List of mountains in Pakistan
 Saltoro Kangri

References 

Mountains of Gilgit-Baltistan
Seven-thousanders of the Karakoram
Mountains of Tibet